Aminolhuda bin Hassan is a Malaysian politician who has served as the Member of Parliament (MP) for Sri Gading since November 2022. He served as the State Leader of the Opposition of Johor from April 2020 to March 2022 and Member of the Johor State Legislative Assembly (MLA) for Parit Yaani from May 2013 to March 2022. He is a member of the National Trust Party (AMANAH), a component party of the Pakatan Harapan (PH) opposition coalition and was a member of the Malaysian Islamic Party (PAS), then component party of then Pakatan Rakyat (PR) opposition coalition. He has served as the State Chairman of AMANAH of Johor since September 2015. He also served as State Chairman of PH of Johor from February 2020 to September 2022. He served as Member of the Johor State Executive Council (EXCO) in the PH state administration under former Menteris Besar Osman Sapian and Sahruddin Jamal from May 2018 to the collapse of the PH state administration in February 2020.

In January 2021, Aminolhuda was tested positive for COVID-19 and had recovered after 14 days in Hospital Sultanah Aminah in Johor Baru.

Election results

External links

References 

Living people
People from Johor
Malaysian people of Malay descent
National Trust Party (Malaysia) politicians
Former Malaysian Islamic Party politicians
Members of the Johor State Legislative Assembly
Leaders of the Opposition in the Johor State Legislative Assembly
Johor state executive councillors
21st-century Malaysian politicians
1959 births